Group 1 of UEFA Euro 1984 was one of only two groups in the final tournament's initial group stage. It began on 12 June and was completed on 19 June. The group consisted of hosts France, Belgium, Denmark, and Yugoslavia.

France won the group and advanced to the semi-finals along with Denmark. Belgium and Yugoslavia were eliminated.

Teams

Standings

In the semi-finals,
The winner of Group 1, France, advanced to play the runner-up of Group 2, Portugal.
The runner-up of Group 1, Denmark, advanced to play the winner of Group 2, Spain.

Matches

France vs Denmark

Belgium vs Yugoslavia

France vs Belgium

Denmark vs Yugoslavia

France vs Yugoslavia

Denmark vs Belgium

References

External links
UEFA Euro 1984 Group 1

Group 1
Group
Belgium at UEFA Euro 1984
Yugoslavia at UEFA Euro 1984
Group